Apollonia or Apolonia (named after the Greek god Apollo)  may refer to :

Places and jurisdictions

Albania 
 Apollonia (Illyria), now Pojani (Polina) in Albania; former bishopric, now Latin titular see

Bulgaria 
 Apollonia, Thrace, now Sozopol, Bulgaria

Greece 
 Apollonia (Aetolia), a town near Naupactus
 Apollonia (Argolis), also known as Troezen
 Apollonia (Athos), a city on Mount Athos
 Apollonia (Chalcidice), a city in the Chalcidice
 Apollonia (Echinades), a town in the Echniades
 Apollonia (Kavala), a city in Kavala, northern Greece
 Apollonia (Mygdonia), an inland city near modern Apollonia, Thessaloniki, reportedly visited by the Apostle Paul
 Apollonia, Sifnos (ancient town), an ancient town on the island of Sifnos
 Apollonia (Sifnos), the main town on the island of Sifnos, taking its name from the former
 Apollonia, Thessaloniki
 Five cities on Crete:
Apellonia, also called Apollonia, on the north coast 
Apollonia (northern Crete), on the north coast
Apollonia (southern Crete), on the south coast
Eleutherna, inland city also called Apollonia
Kydonia, also called Apollonia

Italy 
 Apollonia (Sicily) in Northern Sicily
 Sant'Apollonia (Ancona), in Corinaldo, province of Ancona
 Sant'Apollonia (Brescia), township in Ponte di Legno, province of Brescia
 Sant'Apollonia (Lecco), township in Viganò, locality of Lecco
 Sant'Apollonia (Padua), township in Bagnoli di Sopra Padua, Veneto
 Sant'Apollonia (Turin), township in Val della Torre, province Turin, in the Piedmont region
 Fondamenta Sant'Apollonia, in Venice, Veneto

Asia 
 Surabaya, Indonesia; formerly the Dutch settlement of Fort Apollonia
 Apollonia-Arsuf, near modern Herzliya, Israel
 Anatolia (Turkey)
 Apollonia (Lycia), an ancient city in Lycia
 Apollonia (Lydia), an ancient city in Lydia, also Apollonis
 Apollonia (Mysia), an ancient city in Mysia
 Apollonia (Pisidia) (later called Sozopolis), an ancient city in Pisidia
 Apollonia ad Rhyndacum, a town astride the river Rhyndacus in Bithynia next to the lake Apolloniatis
 Apollonia Salbaces, an ancient city in Anatolia
 Assos, also called Apollonia
 Tripolis on the Meander, also called Apollonia

Elsewhere 
 Sainte-Apollonie island (Île de Sainte-Apollonie), on the Mayenne river in Pays de la Loire, France
 Fort Apollonia, Beyin, Ghana
 Apollonia, Cyrenaica, Libya
 Apolonia, Texas, US
 Apollonia, Wisconsin, US

In space 
 358 Apollonia, a large main belt asteroid
 Apollonia (Mercury), an albedo feature on the planet Mercury

People 
 Saint Apollonia of Alexandria (died 249)
 Apollonia Kotero (born 1959), American musician and actress
 Apollonia 6, a musical group led by Apollonia Kotero
 Apollonia Kickius (1669-1695), Scottish painter
 Apolonia Litwińska (1928-2021), Polish chess player
 Apollonia Mathia (died 2011), South Sudanese journalist
 Apolonia Muñoz Abarca (1920-2009), American healthcare campaigner
 Apollonia Poilâne (born 1984), French baker
 Apolonia Ustrzycka (1736-1814), Polish noblewoman
 Apolonia Vaivai (born 1981), Fijian weightlifter
 Apollonia van Ravenstein (born 1954), Dutch model and actress

Fictional 
 Apollonia Vitelli Corleone, a character in Mario Puzo's The Godfather saga
 Apollonia, aka The Black Knight, a playable character in the Japanese gacha game Granblue Fantasy

Other uses 
 Apollonia University, a private university in Iași, Romania
 KF Apolonia Fier, an Albanian football club based in Fier

See also 
 Apollonias, a genus of plants in the family Lauraceae
 Apolloniatis (disambiguation)
 Apollonopolis (disambiguation)